Füsun Sayek (August 11, 1947 – October 15, 2006) was a Turkish female ophthalmologist and chairperson of the Turkish Medical Association.

Füsun Sayek was born in Bor, Niğde on August 11, 1947, where her father was serving. She completed her primary education in Bor and the middle school in Diyarbakır. In 1964, she finished the high school in Ankara. She studied medicine at Hacettepe University, and graduated in 1970. The career education, which she began at her alma mater in 1971, she continued in the State of New York, the United States until 1976. In 1981i she became a specialist in ophthalmology. She obtained a certificate for community eye healthcare in England in 1986.

Sayek served as a board member in Ankara Medical Association between  1984 and 1986, as a member of the Central Committee of the Turkish Medical Association (TTB) from 1990 to 1994. In 1996, she was elected chairperson of the TBB's central committee. She served at this post until her death in 2006.

Sayek was diagnosed with breast cancer, however, she neglected in treating the disease, which resulted in its advancement. She died in Ankara on October 15, 2006. She was survived by her spouse İskender Sayek (born 1944), an academic of general surgery, and daughter Selin Sayek Böke (born 1972), an economist and politician from the Republican People's Party (CHP). She was buried at her spouse's hometown in İskenderun.

In her honor, Ankara Medical Association holds annually "Dr. Füsun Sayek Medical Education Meeting" on the National Doctors' Day. The "Füsun Sayek Healthcare and Education Development Association" organizes diverse events in the "Sayek House" at Arsuz, Hatay every year in summer.

References

1947 births
People from Bor, Niğde
Hacettepe University alumni
Turkish ophthalmologists
Women ophthalmologists
Deaths from cancer in Turkey
Deaths from breast cancer
2006 deaths
Turkish women physicians
Turkish physicians
20th-century Turkish physicians
21st-century Turkish physicians
20th-century women physicians
21st-century women physicians